Michal Klusáček (born 23 October 1979) is a Czech politician and flight engineer. In 2001–2007 he studied construction of air engines at Samara State Aerospace University. In 2012–2019, he was leader of the Czech National Social Party, when he replaced Jaroslav Rovný. Due to dispute tensions in the party, he was excluded from the party in August 2019 by the new party leadership around Vladislav Svoboda.

References

External links
Official site of ČSNS

1979 births
Living people
Czech National Social Party politicians
Politicians from Prague
Engineers from Prague